Prodiscoglossus is an extinct genus of prehistoric frog in the family Alytidae, the painted frogs.

References

Painted frogs
Prehistoric amphibian genera
Oligocene amphibians
Oligocene animals of Europe
Fossil taxa described in 1944